Polylux may refer to:

 Polylux (overhead projector), produced in the German Democratic Republic 
 Polylux (TV program), is a weekly half-hour German television program